Romeesh Ivey (born 14 July 1994) is a Panamanian professional football midfielder who currently plays for Bulgarian club Spartak Varna and the Panama national team.

Club career

Alianza
Ivey began his professional football career at Alianza in Panama City.

Independiente
On 19 February 2019, Ivey scored two goals in a 4–0 CONCACAF Champions League Round of 16 victory against Toronto FC. It was the first win in international football for Independiente. Ivey spend 2 loan seasons with the Bulgarian Etar.

Spartak Varna
On 6 June 2022 Ivey joined the newly promoted to the Bulgarian First League team Spartak Varna, signing a 3-years long contract deal.

International career
He made his debut for Panama national football team on 28 January 2021 in a friendly game against Serbia. He substituted Misael Acosta in the 58th minute.

Career statistics

References

1994 births
Living people
Panamanian footballers
Panama international footballers
Panamanian expatriate footballers
Panamanian people of Indian descent
People from Arraiján District
Association football forwards
Deportivo Pasto footballers
Alianza Petrolera players
SFC Etar Veliko Tarnovo players
PFC Spartak Varna players
Liga Panameña de Fútbol players
Categoría Primera A players
First Professional Football League (Bulgaria) players
Panamanian expatriate sportspeople in Colombia
Expatriate footballers in Colombia
Expatriate footballers in Bulgaria